Châtelard or Le Châtelard may refer to the following places: 

 Châtelard, Creuse, a commune in the Creuse department, France
 Châtelard, Vaud, a place in the commune of Lutry in the canton of Vaud, Switzerland
 Le Châtelard, Fribourg, a commune in the canton of Fribourg, Switzerland
 Le Châtelard, Savoie, a commune in the Savoie department, France
 Le Châtelard, Valais, a place in the commune of Finhaut in the canton of Valais, Switzerland

See also
 Châtelard Castle (disambiguation)